Rosa González Román (23 July 1942 – 21 January 2019) was a Chilean journalist and politician who served as a Deputy from 11 March 1998 to 11 March 2006.

Early life 
Rosa González was born in the metropolitan district of Buin, on July 23, 1942. She studied first at the School 'Italy', and later studied journalism at the Contemporary University of Arica. She was a columnist for La Estrella de Arica, president of GEICOS and national councilor of the National Mining Society. She was, at first, the creator of the government plan Cordenor (Development Corporation of the North), which was a variant of Cochasa (Development Corporation of Chacalluta SA). She was also delegated by Chile to the Interparliamentary and Business Commission of Conosur (1991–1996), and national director of CORCHILE.

References

1942 births
2019 deaths
People from Maipo Province
Chilean women journalists
20th-century Chilean women politicians
20th-century Chilean politicians
21st-century Chilean women politicians
Women members of the Chamber of Deputies of Chile
Members of the Chamber of Deputies of Chile
Independent Democratic Union politicians
20th-century journalists
Chilean journalists
20th-century Chilean women writers